This is a list of trade unions and union federations by country.

International federations

Global
 Industrial Workers of the World
 International Trade Union Confederation
 International Workers Association
 World Federation of Trade Unions
 International Confederation of Labor
 World Organization of Workers

Sectoral global union federations 

 Building and Wood Workers' International
 Education International
 FIFPro
International Domestic Workers Federation
IndustriALL Global Union
 International Affiliation of Writers Guilds
International Arts and Entertainment Alliance
International Federation of Actors
International Federation of Air Line Pilots' Associations
 International Federation of Journalists
International Federation of Musicians
 International Transport Workers' Federation
 International Union of Food, Agricultural, Hotel, Restaurant, Catering, Tobacco and Allied Workers' Associations
 Public Services International
Trade Union International of Agricultural, Forestry and Plantation Workers
 UNI Global Union

European Federations
List of federations of trade unions in Europe

Albania
 Confederation of Trade Unions (Albania)
 United Independent Albanian Trade Unions

Algeria
 General Union of Algerian Workers
 Union générale des syndicats algériens

Andorra
 Andorran Workers' Union

Angola
 General Centre of Independent and Free Unions of Angola
 Independent Union of Maritime and Related Workers
 National Union of Angolan Workers

Antigua and Barbuda
 Antigua and Barbuda Public Service Association
 Antigua Trades and Labour Union
 Antigua Workers' Union
 Leeward Islands Airline Pilots Association

Argentina
 Argentine Workers' Center
 Consejo Coordinador Argentino Sindical
 Federación Agraria Argentina
 Federación Obrera Regional Argentina
 General Confederation of Labour (Argentina)

Armenia
 Confederation of Trade Unions of Armenia

Aruba
 Aruban Workers' Federation

Australia 

 AFL Players Association
 Australasian Meat Industry Employees Union
 Australian and International Pilots Association
 Australian Council of Trade Unions
 Australian Federation of Air Pilots
 Australian Institute of Marine and Power Engineers
 Australian Manufacturing Workers Union
 Australian Maritime Officers Union
 Australian Nursing and Midwifery Federation
 Australian Rail Tram and Bus Industry Union
 Australian Salaried Medical Officers' Federation
 Australian Services Union
 Australian Workers Union
 Civil Air Operations Officers' Association of Australia
 Communications Electrical and Plumbing Union
 Community and Public Sector Union
 Construction, Forestry, Maritime, Mining and Energy Union
 Finance Sector Union
 Flight Attendants Association of Australia
 Musicians' Union of Australia
 Health Services Union
 Industrial Workers of the World
 Media Entertainment and Arts Alliance
 National Tertiary Education Union
 Police Federation of Australia
 Professionals Australia
 Shop, Distributive and Allied Employees Association
 Transport Workers Union of Australia
 United Firefighters Union of Australia
 United Workers Union

Austria
 Austrian Trade Union Federation
 Industrial Workers of the World
 Viennese Workers Syndicate

Azerbaijan
 Azerbaijan Trade Unions Confederation
 Committee for Oil Industry Workers' Rights
 Journalists Trade Union of Azerbaijan

Bahamas

 Bahamas Airline Pilots Association
 Bahamas Hotel, Catering and Allied Workers Union
 Bahamas Taxi Cab Union
 Commonwealth of the Bahamas Trade Union Congress
 Bahamas Union of Teachers

Bahrain
 General Federation of Workers Trade Unions in Bahrain

Bangladesh
 Bangladesh Free Trade Union Congress
 Bangladesh Ganotantrik Sramik Federation
 Bangladesh Jatio Sramik League
 Bangladesh Jatiyo Sramik Jote
 Bangladesh Jatyatabadi Sramik Dal
 Bangladesh Labour Federation
 Bangladesh Sanjukta Sramik Federation
 Bangladesh Trade Union Kendra
 Jatio Sramik Federation
 Jatyo Sramik League
 Samajtantrik Sramik Front

Barbados
 Barbados Workers' Union
 Congress of Trade Unions and Staff Associations of Barbados
 Leeward Islands Airline Pilots Association
 National Union of Public Workers

Belarus
 Trade unions in Belarus
 Belarus Free Trade Union
 Belarusian Congress of Democratic Trade Unions
 Federation of Trade Unions of Belarus

Belgium
 Confederation of Christian Trade Unions
 General Confederation of Liberal Trade Unions of Belgium
 General Federation of Belgian Labour

Belize
 Christian Workers' Union
 General Workers' Union (Belize)
 National Trade Union Congress of Belize
 United General Workers Union

Benin
 Autonomous Trade Unions Centre
 General Confederation of the Workers of Benin
 National Union of the Unions of the Workers of Benin

Bermuda
 Bermuda Industrial Union
 Bermuda Public Services Association

Bhutan
 Federation of Bhutanese Trade Unions

Bolivia
 Bolivian Workers' Center
 Confederación Sindical Única de Trabajadores Campesinos de Bolivia
 Corriente de Renovación Independiente y Solidaridad Laboral
 Federación Sindical de Trabajadores Mineros de Bolivia

Bosnia and Herzegovina
 Confederation of Independent Trade Unions of Bosnia and Herzegovina
 Confederation of Trade Unions of the Republika Srpska

Botswana
 Botswana Federation of Trade Unions
 Air Botswana Employees' Union
 Botswana Agricultural Marketing Board Workers' Union
 Botswana Bank Employees' Union
 Botswana Beverages & Allied Workers' Union
 Botswana Central Bank Staff Union
 Botswana Commercial & General Workers' Union
 Botswana Construction Workers' Union
 Botswana Diamond Sorters & Valuators' Union
 Botswana Hotel Travel & Tourism Workers' Union
 Botswana Housing Corporation Staff Union
 Botswana Institute of Development Management Workers' Union
 Botswana Manufacturing & Packaging Workers' Union
 Botswana Meat Industry Workers' Union
 Botswana Mining Workers' Union
 Botswana National Development Bank Staff Union
 Botswana Postal Services Workers' Union
 Botswana Power Corporation Workers' Union
 Botswana Private Medical & Health Services Workers' Union
 Botswana Railways Amalgamated Workers' Union
 Botswana Saving Bank Employees' Union
 Botswana Telecommunication Employees' Union
 Botswana Vaccine Institute Staff Union
 Botswana Wholesale, Furniture & Retail Workers' Union
 National Amalgamated Central, Local & Parastatal Manual Workers' Union
 Rural Industry Promotions Company Workers' Union
 University of Botswana Non-Academic Staff Union

Brazil
 Central Autônoma de Trabalhadores
 Central Única dos Trabalhadores
 Confederação Brasileira de Trabalhadores Cristâos
 Confederação Geral dos Trabalhadores
 Confederação Operária Brasileira
 Força Sindical
 Federação das Organizações Sindicalistas Revolucionárias do Brasil

Bulgaria
 Confederation of Independent Trade Unions of Bulgaria
 Confederation of Labour Podkrepa
 National Trade Union Promyana

Burkina Faso
 National Confederation of Workers of Burkina
 National Organisations of Free Trade Unions
 Trade Union Confederation of Burkina

Burundi
 Confederation of Trade Unions of Burundi (Confédération des Syndicats du Burundi, COSYBU)
 Trade Union Confederation of Burundi (Confédération syndicale du Burundi, CSB)

Cambodia
 Free Trade Union of Workers of the Kingdom of Cambodia

Cameroon
 Confederation of Cameroon Trade Unions
 General Confederation of Free Workers of Cameroon
 Union of Free Trade Unions of Cameroon

Canada

 Canadian Labour Congress
 National affiliates
 Alliance of Canadian Cinema, Television and Radio Artists
 British Columbia Teachers' Federation
 Canadian Association of University Teachers
 Canadian Federation of Nurses' Union
 Canadian Office and Professional Employees Union
 Canadian Postmasters and Assistants Association
 Canadian Union of Postal Workers
 Canadian Union of Public Employees
 Elementary Teachers' Federation of Ontario
 National Union of Public and General Employees
 Ontario English Catholic Teachers' Association
 Ontario Secondary School Teachers' Federation
 Professional Institute of the Public Service of Canada
 Public Service Alliance of Canada
 Telecommunications Workers Union
 Unifor (formerly CAW and CEP)
 International affiliates
 Air Line Pilots Association, International
 Amalgamated Transit Union
 American Federation of Musicians
 Bakery, Confectionery, Tobacco Workers and Grain Millers' International Union
 CWA-Canadian Media Guild
 International Alliance of Theatrical Stage Employees, Moving Picture Technicians, Artists and Allied Crafts of the United States, its Territories and Canada
 International Association of Bridge, Structural, Ornamental and Reinforcing Iron Workers
 International Association of Fire Fighters
 International Association of Heat and Frost Insulators and Asbestos Workers
 International Association of Machinists and Aerospace Workers
 International Brotherhood of Boilermakers, Iron Ship Builders, Blacksmiths, Forgers and Helpers
 International Brotherhood of Electrical Workers
 International Federation of Professional and Technical Engineers
 International Longshore and Warehouse Union
 International Longshoremen's Association
 International Union of Bricklayers and Allied Craftworkers
 International Union of Elevator Constructors
 International Union of Operating Engineers
 International Union of Painters and Allied Trades
 Operative Plasterers' and Cement Masons' International Association
 Seafarers' International Union of Canada
 Service Employees International Union
 Sheet Metal Workers International Association
 Teamsters
UNITE HERE
 United Association of Journeymen and Apprentices of the Plumbing and Pipe Fitting Industry
 United Auto Workers
 United Brotherhood of Carpenters and Joiners of America
 United Food and Commercial Workers Union
 United Mine Workers of America
 United Steelworkers
 United Transportation Union
 Independent unions/other affiliations
 Alliance des professeures et professeurs de Montréal
 Canadian Actors' Equity Association
 Centrale des syndicats du Québec
 Confédération des syndicats nationaux
 Congress of Democratic Trade Unions (Quebec)
 Industrial Workers of the World
 Major League Baseball Players Association
 Manitoba Teachers' Society
 National Hockey League Players' Association
 Professional Association of Foreign Service Officers
 Writers Guild of Canada
Company Union
 Christian Labour Association of Canada **

Cape Verde
 Council of Free Labour Unions
 Trade Unions of Cape Verde Unity Centre

Caribbean
 Caribbean Congress of Labour
 Caribbean Public Services Association
 Caribbean Union of Teachers

Cayman Islands
 Cayman Airline Pilots Association

Central African Republic
 Confédération Syndicale des Travailleurs de Centrafrique
 National Confederation of Central African Workers
 Union of Central African Workers

Chad
 Free Confederation of Chadian Workers
 Union of Trade Unions of Chad

Chile
 Central Autónoma de Trabajadores
 Workers' United Center of Chile

People's Republic of China
 All-China Federation of Trade Unions
 All-China Federation of Railway Workers' Unions
 National Committee of the Chinese Agricultural, Forestry and Water Conservancy Workers' Union
 National Committee of the Chinese Aviation Workers' Union
 National Committee of the Chinese Banking Workers' Union
 National Committee of the Chinese Defense Industry, Postal and Telecommunications Workers' Union
 National Committee of the Chinese Educational, Scientific, Cultural, Medical and Sports Workers' Union
 National Committee of the Chinese Energy and Chemical Workers' Union
 National Committee of the Chinese Financial, Commercial, Light Industry, Textile and Tobacco Workers' Union
 National Committee of the Chinese Machinery, Metallurgical and Building Material Workers' Union
 National Committee of the Chinese Seamen and Construction Workers' Union

Colombia
 Central Union of Workers
 Confederation of Workers of Colombia
 General Confederation of Democratic Workers
 SINALTRAINAL

Commonwealth of Independent States
 General Confederation of Trade Unions

Democratic Republic of the Congo
 Confédération Générale du Travail du Congo
 Democratic Confederation of Labour (DRC)
 National Union of Congolese Workers

Republic of the Congo
 Confédération des Syndicats Libres Autonomes du Congo
 Confédération Syndicale des Travailleurs du Congo
 Confédération Syndicale du Congo
 Congolese Trade Union Confederation

Costa Rica
 Central de Trabajadores de Costa Rica
 Central del Movimiento de Trabajadores Costarricenses
 Confederación de Trabajadores de Costa Rica
 Confederación Unitaria de Trabajadores (Costa Rica)
 Costa Rican Confederation of Workers
 Confederación Unitaria de Trabajadores

Croatia
 Association of Croatian Public Sector Unions
 Croatian Trade Union Association
 Independent Trade Unions of Croatia
 Union of Autonomous Trade Unions of Croatia
 Workers' Trade Union Association of Croatia

Cuba
 Confederación General del Trabajo
 Cuban Workers' Solidarity
 Workers' Central Union of Cuba

Cyprus
 Cyprus Turkish Unions Federation
 Cyprus Union of Bank Employees
 Cyprus Workers' Confederation
 Democratic Labour Federation of Cyprus
 Pancyprian Federation of Labour
 Pancyprian Public Servants' Trade Union
 Revolutionary Trade Unions Federation

Czech Republic
 Christian Labour Confederation
 Czech-Moravian Confederation of Trade Unions

Denmark
 Danish Confederation of Professional Associations (AC)
 Danish Association of Chartered Surveyors
 Danish Medical Association
 Danish Union of Architects
 Danish Union of Librarians
 Danish Union of Journalists
 Danish Confederation of Trade Unions (LO)
 Danish Food and Allied Workers' Union
 Danish Timber Industry and Construction Workers' Union
 Danish Union of Metalworkers
 Danish Union of Professional Technicians
 Danish Union of Public Employees
 Fagligt Fælles Forbund
 National Union of Commercial and Clerical Employees
 FTF – Confederation of Professionals in Denmark
 Danish Association of Pharmaconomists
 Danish Nurses Organisation
 Danish Union of Teachers

Djibouti
 General Union of Djibouti Workers
 Union of Djibouti Workers

Dominica
 Dominica Amalgamated Workers' Union
 Dominica Public Service Union
 National Workers' Union (Dominica)
 Waterfront and Allied Workers' Union

Dominican Republic
 Central General de Trabajadores (Dominican Republic)
 Confederación de Trabajadores Unitaria

East Timor
 East Timor Trade Union Confederation

Ecuador
 Confederación de Trabajadores del Ecuador
 Confederación Ecuatoriana de Organizaciones Clasistas Unitarias de Trabajadores
 Ecuador Confederation of Free Trade Union Organizations
 Frente Unitario de los Trabajadores

Egypt
 Egyptian Trade Union Federation

El Salvador
 Central Autónoma de Trabajadores Salvadoreños
 Central de Trabajadores Democráticos
 Federación Nacional Sindical de Trabajadores Salvadoreños

Equatorial Guinea
 Equatorial Guinea Workers' Union

Eritrea
 National Confederation of Eritrean Workers

Estonia
 Confederation of Estonian Trade Unions
 Estonian Employees' Unions' Confederation

Ethiopia
 Confederation of Ethiopian Trade Unions
 Ethiopian Teachers' Association
 Commercial Bank of Ethiopia Trade Union

Fiji

 Federation of Cane Growers
 Fiji Islands Council of Trade Unions
 Fiji Trades Union Congress
 Indian Cane Growers Association
 Kisan Sangh
 Labasa Kisan Sangh
 Maha Sangh
 National Farmers Union of Fiji
 Rewa Planters Union
 Vishal Sangh

Finland

The three major confederations:

 Central Organisation of Finnish Trade Unions
 Confederation of Unions for Academic Professionals in Finland AKAVA
 Finnish Confederation of Salaried Employees STTK

Individual trade unions

 Association of Employees in Government Educational Administration
 Finnish Association of Architects
 Finnish Association of Graduate Engineers
 Finnish Union of Practical Nurses
 Union of Health and Social Care Services
 Union of Salaried Employees

France

Major confederations 
 Confédération Française Démocratique du Travail
 Confédération Française des Travailleurs Chrétiens
 Confédération Française de l'Encadrement - Confédération Générale des Cadres
 Confédération Générale du Travail
 Force Ouvrière

Other important unions
 Fédération Syndicale Unitaire
 Solidaire
 Union Nationale des Syndicats Autonomes

Gabon
 Gabonese Confederation of Free Trade Unions
 Gabonese Trade Union Confederation

The Gambia
 Gambia Workers' Union
 Gambian Workers' Confederation
 The Gambia Press Union

Georgia
 Georgian Trade Union Confederation

Germany

Major confederations 
 Christlicher Gewerkschaftsbund (CGB) German Christian Workers' Federation
 Deutscher Beamtenbund (dbb) German Civil Service Federation
 komba gewerkschaft
 Deutscher Gewerkschaftsbund (DGB) German Confederation of Trade Unions
 Gewerkschaft Erziehung und Wissenschaft
 Gewerkschaft Nahrung-Genuss-Gaststätten
 IG Bauen-Agrar-Umwelt
 IG Bergbau, Chemie, Energie
 IG Metall
 Trade Union of the Police
 Eisenbahn- und Verkehrsgewerkschaft
 ver.di

Independent unions 
 
 Free Workers' Union
 Gewerkschaft Deutscher Lokomotivführer

Ghana
 Ghana Federation of Labour
 Trades Union Congress of Ghana

Gibraltar
 CITIPEG

Historical unions
 Gibraltar Apprentices and Ex-Apprentices Union
 Gibraltar Confederation of Labour
 Gibraltar Labour Trades Union

Greece
 Trade unions in Greece

Greenland
 Danish Trade Union Confederation
 Greenlandic Civil Service Confederation (AK) Atorfillit Kattuffiat
 Danish Association of Lawyers and Economists (DJØF) DJØF Kalaallit Nunaanni
 Danish Confederation of Professional Associations (AC) Ilinniagaqarluarsimasut Qitiusumik Suleqatigiiffiat
 Danish Association of Chartered Surveyors
 Danish Medical Association (NP) Nakorsat Peqatigiiffiat
 Danish Union of Architects (IP) Illussanik Titartaasartut Peqatigiiffiat
 Danish Union of Librarians
 Danish Union of Journalists (TP) Tusagassiuinermi Sulisut Peqatigiiffiat
 Danish Confederation of Trade Unions (LO)
 Danish Union of Professional Technicians
 Danish Union of Public Employees
 FTF – Confederation of Professionals in Denmark
 Danish Association of Pharmaconomists
 Greenlandic Achademics Confederation (IK) Ilinniagartuut Kattuffiat
 Greenlandic Teachers Confederation (IMAK) ‘’Ilinniartitsisut Meeqqat Atuarfianneersut Kattuffiat
 Greenlandic Kindergarten Teachers Confederation (NPK) Nunatsinni Perorsaasut Kattuffiat
 Greenlandic Nurses Organization (PPK) Peqqissaasut Kattuffiat
 National Confederation of Trade Unions of Greenland (SIK) Sulinermik Inuussutissarsiuteqartut Kattuffiat 
 Greenlandic Supervisors Union (SSK) Sulisunik Siulersuisut Kattuffiat

Grenada
 Grenada Trades Union Council

Guatemala
 Central General de Trabajadores de Guatemala
 Confederación de Unidad Sindical de Guatemala
 Unión Sindical de Trabajadores de Guatemala

Guinea
 General Union of the Workers of Guinea
 National Confederation of Guinean Workers
 National Organization of Free Unions of Guinea
 United Trade Union of Guinean Workers

Guinea-Bissau
 National Union of Workers of Guinea-Bissau

Guyana
 Guyana Agricultural and General Workers' Union
 Guyana Labour Union
 National Workers' Union (Guyana)

Haiti
 Batay Ouvriye
 Confederation des Travailleurs Haïtiens
 Coordination Syndicale Haïtienne (CSH)
 Haitian Trade Union Coordination
 May 1st - Workers' Fight Federation

Honduras
 Central General de Trabajadores (Honduras)
 Confederación Unitaria de Trabajadores de Honduras
 Federación Unitaria de Trabajadores de Honduras
 Honduras Workers' Confederation

Hong Kong
 Hong Kong and Kowloon Trades Union Council
 Hong Kong Confederation of Trade Unions
 Hong Kong Federation of Trade Unions
 Hong Kong Journalists Association
 Hong Kong Professional Teachers' Union
 Hong Kong Social Workers' General Union
 Joint Organization of Unions - Hong Kong

Hungary
 Autonomous Trade Union Confederation
 Democratic Confederation of Free Trade Unions
 Forum for the Cooperation of Trade Unions

Iceland
 Confederation of State and Municipal Employees of Iceland
 Icelandic Federation of Labour
 Industrial Workers of the World

India
see Indian Trade Unions.
 Bengal Jute Mill Workers' Union
 Bengal Provincial Chatkal Mazdoor Union
 Centre of Indian Trade Unions
 Bengal Chatkal Mazdoor Union
 Calcutta Tramways Workers' and Employees' Union
 Cochin City Motor Thozhilali Union
 Darjeeling District Newspaper Sellers' Union
 Forward Seamens Union of India
 Joint Forum of Trade Unions
 Maharashtra Sugarcane Cutting and Transport Workers Union
 Otis Elevators Employees Union
 Steel Plant Employees Union
 All India Defence Employees Federation
 Association of Motion Pictures & TV Programme Producer of India
 Federation of Western India Cine Employees
 Hind Mazdoor Kisan Panchayat
 Konkan Railway Corporation Employees Union
 Municipal Mazdoor Union
 Hind Mazdoor Sabha
 All India Jute Textile Workers' Federation
 Coimbatore District Textile Workers Union
 Kudremukh Shram Shakthi Sanghatan
 MCF Employees' Union
 Darjeeling Jela Dokan Sramik Union
 Indian National Trade Union Congress
 Kerala Gazetted Officers' Federation
 Kerala State Transport Employees Front
 Labour Progressive Federation
 NLC Workers Progressive Union
 Maharashtra General Kamgar Union
 Mazdoor Mukti Morcha
 Rashtriya Mill Mazdoor Sangh
 Socialist Trade Union Centre
 Trade Union Centre of India
 Trade Union Coordination Committee
 Bengal Hawkers Association
 United Trade Union Centre-Lenin Sarani

Indonesia
 Confederation of All Indonesian Workers' Union
 Confederation of Indonesia Prosperous Trade Union
 Congress of Indonesia Unions Alliance
 Indonesian Railways Workers' Union
 Indonesian Trade Union Confederation

Iran

Historical unions
 Central Council of Trade Unions
 Central Council of United Trade Unions
 Central Union of Workers and Peasants of Iran
 Ettehadiyeh-ye Sendika-ye Kargaran-e Iran
 Union of Toilers of Iran

Current unions
 Iranian Workers' Solidarity Network
 Syndicate of Workers of Tehran and Suburbs Bus Company
 Workers' House of the Islamic Republic of Iran
 Iranian Teachers' Trade Association
 Association of Iranian Journalists

Iraq
 Federation of Oil Unions in Iraq
 General Federation of Trade Unions
 Iraqi Federation of Trade Unions

Ireland
 Irish Congress of Trade Unions

Israel
 Histadrut
 Koah LaOvdim

Italy

Major confederations
 Italian General Confederation of Labour (CGIL)
 Confederazione Italiana Sindacati Lavoratori (CISL)
 Unione Italiana del Lavoro (UIL)

Other unions
 Confederazione del Comitati di Base
 CONFSAL
 DIRFOR
 General Labour Union (Italy)
 Italian Confederation of Free Workers' Unions
 Italian Confederation of Workers' Trade Unions
 Italian General Confederation of Labour
 Italian Labour Union
 Unione Sindacale Italiana

Ivory Coast
 Centrale des Syndicats Libres de Côte d'Ivoire
 Federation of Autonomous Trade Unions of Ivory Coast
 General Workers Union in Ivory Coast

Jamaica
 Bustamante Industrial Trade Union
 Jamaica Airline Pilots Association
 Jamaica Association of Local Government Officers
 Jamaica Confederation of Trade Unions
 National Workers Union

Japan
 General Union
 Japan Teachers Union
 National Union of General Workers
 RENGO
 Sohyo
 Tozen
 Zenzōsen

Jordan
 General Federation of Jordanian Trade Unions
 Jordanian Engineers Association
 Jordan Dental Association
 Jordanian teachers' syndicate

Kazakhstan
 Confederation of Labour of Kazakhstan
 Federation of Trade Unions of the Republic of Kazakhstan

Kenya
 Central Organization of Trade Unions (Kenya)

Kiribati
 Kiribati Trade Union Congress

Kuwait
 Kuwait Trade Union Federation

Kyrgyzstan
 Kyrgyzstan Federation of Trade Unions

Laos 
 Lao Federation of Trade Unions

Latvia
 Free Trade Confederation of Latvia

Lebanon
 General Confederation of Lebanese Workers
 Lebanese Order of Physicians

Lesotho
 Congress of Lesotho Trade Unions
 Lesotho Congress of Democratic Unions
 Lesotho Trade Union Congress

Liberia
 Liberian Federation of Labour Unions

Libya
 National Trade Unions' Federation

Liechtenstein
 Liechtenstein Employees' Association

Lithuania
 Lithuanian Labour Federation
 Lithuanian Trade Union Confederation
 Lithuanian Trade Union - Solidarity

Luxembourg
 Free Luxembourger Workers' Union
 Luxembourg Confederation of Christian Trade Unions

Republic of Macedonia
 Federation of Trade Unions of Macedonia

Madagascar
 Christian Confederation of Malagasy Trade Unions
 Confederation of Malagasy Workers
 United Autonomous Unions of Madagascar

Malawi
Malawi Congress of Trade Unions

Malaysia
 Congress of Unions of Employees in the Public and Civil Services
 Malaysian Trades Union Congress
 National Council of Unions of the Industrial and Lower Income Group of Government Workers
 National Union of Plantation Workers

Mali
 National Workers' Union of Mali
 Workers' Trade Union Confederation of Mali

Malta
 Confederation of Malta Trade Unions
 General Workers' Union (Malta)
 Malta Union of Teachers
 Malta Workers' Union

Mauritania
 Free Confederation of Mauritanian Workers
 General Confederation of Mauritanian Workers
 Union of Mauritanian Workers

Mauritius
 Federation of Civil Service Unions
 Federation of Progressive Unions
 Mauritius Labour Congress
 Mauritius Trade Union Congress
 National Trade Unions Confederation
 Organization of Artisans' Unity
Telecommunications Employees and Staff Association

Mexico
 Authentic Labor Front
 Confederación Revolucionaria de Obreros y Campesinos
 Confederation of Mexican Workers
 General Confederation of Workers (Mexico)
 National Association of Actors (Asociación Nacional de Actores)
 National Social Security Workers Union
 National Union of Mine and Metal Workers of the Mexican Republic
 Regional Confederation of Mexican Workers
 Sindicato de Trabajadores Ferrocarrileros de la República Mexicana
 Sindicato Nacional de Trabajadores de la Educación
 Sindicato Nacional de Trabajadores Petroleros de la República Mexicana
 Union of Cinema Production Workers

Moldova
 Confederation of Trade Unions of the Republic of Moldova

Monaco
Union of Monaco Trade Unions

Mongolia
 Confederation of Mongolian Trade Unions
 Solidarity Trade Union

Morocco
 Democratic Confederation of Labour (Morocco)
 Democratic Federation of Labour
 General Union of Moroccan Workers
 Moroccan Workers' Union
 National Labour Union of Morocco

Mozambique
 Mozambique Workers' Organization
 National Confederation of Free and Independent Trade Unions of Mozambique

Myanmar
 Federation of Trade Unions of Burma
 Seafarers' Union of Burma

Namibia
 SWAPO
 National Union of Namibian Workers
 Trade Union Congress of Namibia

Netherlands
 Christelijk Nationaal Vakverbond
 CNV Public
 Federatie Nederlandse Vakbeweging
 Nederlands Verbond van Vakverenigingen
 Vakcentrale Voor Middengroepen en Hoger Personeel
 Vrije Bond
 Transport Workers' Union
 Construction and Wood Union
 General Dutch Construction Union

Netherlands Antilles
 Bonaire Federation of Labour
 Central General di Trahadonan di Corsow
 Trade Union Centre of Curaçao
 Windward Islands Federation of Labour

New Zealand
Amalgamated Workers Union of New Zealand
 Central Amalgamated Workers' Union
 Northern Amalgamated Workers' Union
 Southern Amalgamated Workers' Union
 APEX
 Association of Salaried Medical Specialists
 Association of Staff in Tertiary Education Te Hau Takatini o Aotearoa
 Association of University Staff of New Zealand
 Clothing, Laundry and Allied Workers Union of Aotearoa
 Corrections Association of New Zealand
 Customs Officers' Association of New Zealand
 Engineering, Printing and Manufacturing Union
 Finance and Information Workers Union
 Firestone Employees Society
 Flight Attendants and Related Services Association
 Furniture, Manufacturing & Associated Workers Union
 Maritime Union of New Zealand
 Meat Union Aotearoa
 National Distribution Union
 National Union of Public Employees (New Zealand)
 New Zealand Air Line Pilots' Association
 New Zealand Building Trades Union
 New Zealand Council of Trade Unions
 New Zealand Dairy Workers Union
 New Zealand Educational Institute Te Riu Roa
 New Zealand Meat & Related Trades Workers Union
 New Zealand Nurses Organisation
 New Zealand Professional Firefighters Union
 New Zealand Public Service Association
 New Zealand Writers Guild
 NZ Merchant Service Guild Industrial Union of Workers
 Post Primary Teachers' Association
 Rail & Maritime Transport Union
 Service & Food Workers Union of Aotearoa
 Solidarity Union
 Unite Union

Nicaragua
 Confederation of Labour Unification
 Nicaraguan Workers' Centre
 Sandinista Workers' Centre

Niger
 Democratic Confederation of Workers of Niger
 General Union of Workers of Niger
 Union of Workers' Trade Unions of Niger

Norway
 Confederation of Unions for Professionals, Norway
 EL & IT Forbundet
 Federation of Norwegian Professional Associations
 NITO
 Norwegian Civil Service Union
 Norwegian Confederation of Trade Unions(LO)
 Norwegian Post and Communications Union
 Norwegian Prison and Probation Officers’ Union
 Norwegian Seafarers' Union
 Norwegian Syndicalist League
Norwegian Transport Workers' Union
 Norwegian Union of Food, Beverage and Allied Workers
 Norwegian Union of General Workers
 Norwegian Union of Industry and Energy Workers
 Norwegian Union of Municipal and General Employees
 Union of Employees in Commerce and Offices
 United Federation of Trade Unions

Pakistan

Pakistan Workers Confederation
 All Pakistan Federation of Labour
 All Pakistan Federation of Trade Unions
 All Pakistan Federation of United Trade Unions
 All Pakistan Trade Union Congress
 All Pakistan Trade Union Federation
 Pakistan Labour Federation
 Pakistan National Federation of Trade Unions
Pakistan Trade Union Defence Campaign
 Pakistan Transport & General Workers' Federation
 Pakistan Workers' Federation
 Railway Worker's Union (Open Lines)

Panama
 Central National de Trabajadores de Panama
 Confederation of Workers of the Republic of Panama
 Convergencia Sindical
 General Confederation of Workers of Panama
 SUNTRACS

Papua New Guinea
 Papua New Guinea Trade Union Congress

Paraguay
 Central Unitaria de Trabajadores (Paraguay)
 Confederación Paraguaya de Trabajadores
 National Workers' Central (Paraguay)

Peru
 Central Autónoma de Trabajadores del Perú
 Confederación de Trabajadores del Perú
 Confederación General de Trabajadores del Perú
 Confederación Unitaria de Trabajadores del Perú

Philippines
 Federation of Free Workers
 May First Labour Movement Centre
 Trade Union Congress of the Philippines

Poland
 All-Poland Alliance of Trade Unions
 Solidarity
 Trade Unions Forum
 Workers' Initiative

Portugal
 General Confederation of Labour (Portugal)
 General Confederation of the Portuguese Workers
 General Union of Workers (Portugal)
 Union of Independent Trade Unions (Portugal)

Puerto Rico
 General Confederation of Workers (Puerto Rico)
 Teachers' Federation of Puerto Rico

Romania
 Democratic Trade Union Confederation of Romania
 National Confederation of Free Trade Unions of Romania - Brotherhood
 National Trade Union Bloc
 National Trade Union Confederation (Romania)
 National Trade Union Confederation - Meridian

Russia

 All-Russian Confederation of Labour
 Artists Trade Union of Russia
 Confederation of Labour of Russia
 Confederation of Revolutionary Anarcho-Syndicalists
 Federation of Independent Trade Unions of Russia
 Siberian Confederation of Labour

Rwanda
 Trade Union Centre of Workers of Rwanda
 Union of Workers in Industry, Garages, Construction Firms, Mines and Printers

Saint Kitts and Nevis
 St. Kitts and Nevis Trades and Labour Union

Saint Vincent and the Grenadines
 Commercial, Technical and Allied Workers' Union
 National Labour Congress
 National Workers' Movement (St. Vincent)
 St. Vincent and the Grenadines Public Service Union

Samoa
Samoa Public Service Association
Samoa Trade Union Congress

San Marino
 Democratic Confederation of San Marino Workers
 San Marino Confederation of Labour

São Tomé and Príncipe
 General Union of the Workers of São Tomé and Príncipe
 National Organization of the Workers of São Tomé and Príncipe - Central Union

Senegal
 Dakar Dem Dikk Workers Democratic Union
 Democratic Union of Senegalese Workers
 National Confederation of Senegalese Workers
 National Union of Autonomous Trade Unions of Senegal

Serbia
 Postmans Trade Union

Seychelles
 Seychelles Federation of Workers' Unions
 Seychelles Workers Union

Sierra Leone
 Sierra Leone Confederation of Trade Unions
 Sierra Leone Labour Congress

Singapore
 National Trades Union Congress

Slovakia
 Confederation of Trade Unions of the Slovak Republic
 Independent Christian Trade Unions of Slovakia
 Priama akcia
 Unity Trade Union

Slovenia
 Association of Free Trade Unions of Slovenia
 Confederation of New Trade Unions of Slovenia
 Confederation of Trade Unions of Slovenia - Pergam
 Trade Union Confederation 90 of Slovenia

Solomon Islands
 Solomon Islands Council of Trade Unions

South Africa
 Confederation of South African Workers' Unions
 Solidarity
 Congress of South African Trade Unions
 Association of Mineworkers and Construction Union
 Chemical, Energy, Paper, Printing, Wood and Allied Workers' Union
 Communication Workers Union (South Africa)
 Democratic Nursing Organisation of South Africa
 Food and Allied Workers Union
 Musicians Union of South Africa</ref>
National Education, Health and Allied Workers' Union
 National Union of Metalworkers of South Africa
 Performing Arts Workers' Equity
 Police and Prisons Civil Rights Union
SASBO - The Finance Union
 South African Agricultural Plantation and Allied Workers Union
 South African Commercial, Catering and Allied Workers Union
 South African Democratic Nurses' Union
 South African Democratic Teachers Union
 South African Football Players Union
South African Medical Association
 South African Municipal Workers' Union
 South African State and Allied Workers' Union
 South African Transport and Allied Workers Union
 Southern African Clothing and Textile Workers Union
 Federation of Unions of South Africa
 Health & Other Services Personnel Trade Union of South Africa
 Independent Municipal & Allied Trade Union
 Public Servants Association of South Africa
 United Association of South Africa
 National Council of Trade Unions
 Association of Mineworkers and Construction Union
 National Professional Teachers' Organisation of South Africa

South Korea
 Federation of Korean Trade Unions
 Korean Confederation of Trade Unions
 Korean Teachers & Education Workers' Union

Spain

 Agrarian Trade Union Federation
 Basque Workers' Solidarity
 Confederación General del Trabajo
 Confederación Nacional del Trabajo
 Confederación Intersindical Galega
 Intersindical - Confederació Sindical Catalana
 Langile Abertzaleen Batzordeak
 Spanish Trade Union Organisation
 Typographic Workers Trade Union
 Unión General de Trabajadores
 Workers Collectives
 Workers' Commissions (CCOO)
 Workers in Struggle Collectives

Sri Lanka
 All Ceylon United Motor Workers' Union
 Ceylon Federation of Labour
 Ceylon Mercantile Union
 GCSU Sri Lanka
 National Union of Workers
 United Corporations and Mercantile Union

Sudan
 Sudanese Workers' Trade Union Federation

Suriname
 Federation of Civil Service Organizations
 General Alliance of Labour Unions in Suriname
 Organization of Cooperating Autonomous Trade Unions
 Progressive Labour Federation 47

Swaziland
 Swaziland Federation of Labour
 Swaziland Federation of Trade Unions

Sweden
 Central Organisation of the Workers of Sweden
 Swedish Confederation of Professional Associations
 Swedish Confederation of Professional Employees
 Swedish Trade Union Confederation

Switzerland
 Swiss Federation of Trade Unions
 Travail.Suisse

Syria
 General Federation of Trade Unions (Syria)

Taiwan
 Chinese Federation of Labour
 Taiwan Confederation of Trade Unions

Tajikistan
 Tajikistan Federation of Trade Unions

Tanzania
Tanzania Teachers’ Union
Trade Union' Congress of Tanzania
 Zanzibar Trade Union Congress

Thailand
 Labour Congress of Thailand
 National Congress of Thai Labour
 Thai Trade Union Congress

Togo
 National Confederation of Togolese Workers
 National Union of Independent Trade Unions of Togo
 Trade Union Confederation of Togolese Workers

Tonga
 Friendly Islands Teachers' Association
 Tonga Nurses' Association

Trinidad and Tobago

Current unions 
 Airline Superintendents Association
 Amalgamated Workers Union
 Association of Technical, Administrative and Supervisory Staff
 Aviation, Communication and Allied Workers Union
 Banking, Insurance and General Workers Union
 Communication, Transport and General Workers Union
 Communication Workers Union
 Customs and Excise Extra Guards Association
 Electronic Media Union of Trinidad and Tobago
 Estate Police Association
 Federation of Independent Trade Unions and Non-Governmental Organisations
 Fire Services Association
 Managers and Supervisors Association
 National Petroleum Staff Association
 National Trade Union Centre of Trinidad and Tobago
 National Union of Domestic Employees
 National Union of Government and Federated Workers
 National Workers' Union
 Oilfields Workers' Trade Union
 Public Services Association
 Seamen and Waterfront Workers Trade Union
 Steel Workers Union of Trinidad and Tobago
 Transport and Industrial Workers Union
 Trinidad and Tobago Airline Pilots Association
 Trinidad and Tobago Postal Workers Union
 Trinidad and Tobago Unified Teachers Association
 Union of Commercial and Industrial Workers

Historical unions 
 All Trinidad Sugar Estates and Factory Workers Union
 Amalgamated Engineering and General Workers' Trade Union
 Bank and General Workers Union
 Bank Employees' Union
 British Colonial Taxpayers and All Workers Union
 Civil Service Association
 Communication Services and General Workers Trade Union
 Federated Workers Trade Union
 Government Farm and Nursery Workers Trade Union
 Industrial and Railway Employees Trade Union
 National Union of Government Employees
 Public Works and Public Service Workers Trade Union
 Staff Association of Barclays Bank of Trinidad and Tobago Limited
 TTT Senior Staff Association
 Works and Hydraulics Industrial Workers Union

Tunisia
 Tunisian General Labour Union (created in 1946)

Turkey
 Confederation of Public Workers' Unions
 Confederation of Revolutionary Trade Unions of Turkey
 Confederation of Turkish Real Trade Unions
 Confederation of Turkish Trade Unions
 Industrial Workers of the World

Turkmenistan
 National Centre of Trade Unions of Turkmenistan

Tuvalu
 Tuvalu Overseas Seamen's Union

Uganda
 National Organization of Trade Unions

Ukraine
 Confederation of Free Trade Unions of Ukraine
 Federation of Trade Unions of Ukraine
 National Confederation of the Trade-Union Organizations of Ukraine

United Kingdom

 General Federation of Trade Unions (UK)
 Scottish Trades Union Congress
 Trades Union Congress

Current unions 
The following is a list of major independent trade unions, which are solely accountable to their members and free from employer domination as it stood on 31 March 2012.

 Associated Society of Locomotive Engineers and Firemen ASLEF 
 Association of Teachers and Lecturers ATL 
 Bakers, Food and Allied Workers Union BFAWU 
 British Air Line Pilots Association BALPA 
 Broadcasting, Entertainment, Cinematograph and Theatre Union BECTU 
 British Medical Association Medical Doctors BMA
 Ceramic and Allied Trades Union CATU 
 Communication Workers Union CWU 
 Community (trade union) 
 Community and Youth Workers' Union
 Connect - formerly the Society of Telecommunications Executives (STE)
 Doctors In Unite Medical Doctors (affiliated with Unite and the TUC)
 Educational Institute of Scotland EIS 
 EQUITY (actors) 
 Fire Brigades Union FBU 
 First Division Association (senior civil servants) 
 GMB (General workers' union) 
 Graphical, Paper and Media Union GPMU 
 Hospital Consultants and Specialists Association HCSA 
 Industrial Workers of the World IWW 
 International Union of Sex Workers 
 Musicians' Union MU 
 National Association of Probation Officers NAPO 
 National Association of Schoolmasters Union of Women Teachers NASUWT 
 National Union of Journalists NUJ 
 National Union of Marine, Aviation and Shipping Transport Officers NUMAST 
 National Union of Mineworkers NUM
 National Union of Teachers NUT 
 Offshore Industry Liaison Committee OILC 
 Prison Officers Association POA 
 Professional Association of Teachers PAT 
 Professional Footballers Association PFA 
 Prospect (engineering, scientific, management and professional staff) 
 Public and Commercial Services Union PCS
 National Union of Rail, Maritime and Transport Workers RMT 
 Royal College of Nursing RCN  (legally a professional society rather than a trade union)
 Scottish Artists Union SAU
 Society of Radiographers SoR 
 Solidarity Federation 
 Transport and General Workers Union T&G / TGWU 
 Transport Salaried Staffs' Association TSSA 
 Undeb Cenedlaethol Athrawon Cymru (National Union of Teachers of Wales) UCAC 
 UNIFI (trade union) (Financial services) 
 Union of Construction, Allied Trades and Technicians UCATT
 Union of Shop, Distributive and Allied Workers USDAW 
 UNISON (Public services)
 Unite - the Union
 University and College Union, amalgam of the AUT and NATFHE.
 The Writers' Guild of Great Britain WGGB

United States

AFL–CIO
(The American Federation of Labor and Congress of Industrial Organizations)

 Air Line Pilots Association
 Amalgamated Transit Union
 American Federation of Government Employees
 American Federation of Musicians
 American Federation of School Administrators
 American Federation of State, County and Municipal Employees
 American Federation of Teachers
 American Federation of Television and Radio Artists
 American Postal Workers Union
 American Train Dispatchers Department
 Associated Actors and Artistes of America
 Actors' Equity Association
 American Guild of Musical Artists
 American Guild of Variety Artists
 The Guild of Italian American Actors
 Screen Actors Guild - American Federation of Television and Radio Artists
 Bakery, Confectionery, Tobacco Workers and Grain Millers' International Union
 Brotherhood of Railroad Signalmen
 California Nurses Association/ National Nurses Organizing Committee
 California School Employees Association
 Communications Workers of America
 Farm Labor Organizing Committee
 Federation of Professional Athletes/National Football League Players Association
 Glass, Molders, Pottery, Plastics and Allied Workers International Union
International Alliance of Theatrical Stage Employees
 International Association of Bridge, Structural, Ornamental and Reinforcing Iron Workers
 International Association of Fire Fighters
 International Association of Heat and Frost Insulators and Asbestos Workers
 International Association of Machinists and Aerospace Workers
 International Brotherhood of Boilermakers, Iron Ship Builders, Blacksmiths, Forgers and Helpers
 International Brotherhood of Electrical Workers
 International Federation of Professional and Technical Engineers
 International Longshore and Warehouse Union
 International Longshoremen's Association
 International Plate Printers, Die Stampers and Engravers Union of North America
 International Union of Allied Novelty and Production Workers
 International Union of Bricklayers and Allied Craftworkers
 International Union of Elevator Constructors
 International Union of Operating Engineers
 International Union of Painters and Allied Trades
 International Union of Police Associations
 Laborers' International Union of North America
 Marine Engineers Beneficial Association
 National Air Traffic Controllers Association
 National Association of Letter Carriers
 National Football League Players Association
 Office and Professional Employees International Union
 Operative Plasterers' and Cement Masons' International Association
 Professional Aviation Safety Specialists
 Seafarers International Union of North America
 Sheet Metal Workers International Association
 Transport Workers Union of America
 UNITE HERE
 United American Nurses
 United Association of Journeymen and Apprentices of the Plumbing, Pipefitting and Sprinkler Fitting Industry of the United States and Canada
 United Automobile, Aerospace & Agricultural Implement Workers of America International Union
 United Food and Commercial Workers
 United Mine Workers of America
 United Steel, Paper and Forestry, Rubber, Manufacturing, Energy, Allied Industrial and Service Workers International Union
 United Transportation Union
 United Union of Roofers, Waterproofers and Allied Workers
 Utility Workers Union of America
 Writers Guild of America, East

Change to Win Federation
(The Change to Win Federation)

 International Brotherhood of Teamsters
 Service Employees International Union
 Workers United
 United Farm Workers of America

Independent
 Aircraft Mechanics Fraternal Association
 Coalition of Graduate Employee Unions
 Directors Guild of America
 Dramatists Guild of America
 Fraternal Order of Police
 Independent Pilots Association
 Industrial Workers of the World
 Jockeys' Guild
 Major League Baseball Players Association
 National Basketball Players Association
 National Education Association
 National Rural Letter Carriers Association
 National Treasury Employees Union
 NHL Players Association
 Professional Lacrosse Players' Association
 Programmers Guild
 Stage Directors and Choreographers Society
 United Brotherhood of Carpenters and Joiners of America
 United Electrical, Radio and Machine Workers of America
 US Airline Pilots Association
 World Umpires Association
 Writers Guild of America, west

Union reform groups
 Labor Notes
 Teamsters for a Democratic Union

Uruguay
 Plenario Intersindical de Trabajadores - Convención Nacional de Trabajadores

Uzbekistan
 Federation of Trade Unions of Uzbekistan

Vanuatu
 Vanuatu Council of Trade Unions

Vatican City
 Association of Vatican Lay Workers

Venezuela

 Confederación de Trabajadores de Venezuela
 Movimiento Nacional de Trabajadores Para La Liberación
 Unión Nacional de Trabajadores de Venezuela

Vietnam
 Vietnamese General Confederation of Labour

Western Sahara
 General Workers' Union of Saguia el-Hamra and Río de Oro

Yemen
 Yemeni Confederation of Labor Unions

Zambia
 Federation of Free Trade Unions of Zambia
 Zambia Congress of Trade Unions
 Zambia Union of Financial Institutions and Allied Workers

Zimbabwe

 Zimbabwe Congress of Trade Unions which includes the defunct African Trade Union Congress

See also

 List of civic, fraternal, service, and professional organizations
 List of employer associations
 List of federations of trade unions
 List of reference tables for more lists in the field of business
 History of trade unions in the USSR
 List of Wikipedia articles on labor unions
 List of international labor organizations
 Lists of organizations

References 

Lists of trade unions